Royston Clarke  OBE (born 28 January 1930), usually known as Roy Clarke, is an English comedy writer best known for creating the sitcoms Last of the Summer Wine, Keeping Up Appearances, Open All Hours and its sequel series, Still Open All Hours.

Early life
Clarke was born in Austerfield in the West Riding of Yorkshire. His jobs before becoming a writer included teacher, policeman, taxi driver, salesman and he was a soldier in the Royal Corps of Signals of the British Army.

Career
In the late 1960s, Clarke wrote thrillers for BBC Radio. The first in January 1968, The 17-Jewelled Shockproof Swiss-Made Bomb, featured Peter Coke, Ben Kingsley, Bob Grant and Anne Stallybrass. A couple of months later. The Events at Black Tor was a police thriller which also featured Bob Grant along with James Beck.

Clarke was the sole writer of the long-running Last of the Summer Wine, which at its peak had an audience of over 18 million viewers. It featured Bill Owen, Peter Sallis, Brian Wilde, Kathy Staff and Dame Thora Hird in leading roles. While Clarke was not involved in casting, he wrote the character named Clegg with Sallis specifically in mind.

Clarke also wrote a prequel, First of the Summer Wine, The Misfit, starring Ronald Fraser; Open All Hours, starring Ronnie Barker and David Jason; Keeping Up Appearances, starring Patricia Routledge; and Ain't Misbehavin'.

Clarke created and wrote the short-lived fantasy drama, The Wanderer starring Bryan Brown, for Sky One. In 1974, he created the sitcom Oh No It's Selwyn Froggitt from an idea by its star Bill Maynard. He wrote the pilot episode, but left to be replaced by  Alan Plater when the programme went to series. Clarke has worked in film penning the screenplay to Hawks (1988) and he wrote the well received drama A Foreign Field (1993).

In 2003, Clarke adapted his Last of the Summer Wine chronicle The Moonbather for a world premiere performance at the Scunthorpe Little Theatre Club.

In 2002, he received an OBE for his contribution to British comedy. In 1994, Clarke was granted the Freedom of the Borough of Doncaster; the highest honour the Council can bestow. He was awarded the lifetime achievement award at the 2010 British Comedy Awards.

In 2013, he resurrected Open All Hours for a sequel series, Still Open All Hours starring David Jason six series were  broadcast.

In 2016, he created a prequel to Keeping Up Appearances titled Young Hyacinth. The one-off episode premiered on 2 September 2016 on BBC One.

Personal life

Clarke resided in rural Goole in the East Riding of Yorkshire with his wife, Enid Kitching. For some years he owned Horton Rounds in Northamptonshire, a Grade II listed house designed by the Northamptonshire architect Arthur A. J. Marshman.

See also 
 Keeping Up Appearances (characters and episodes)

References

External links

1930 births
Living people
English television writers
British television writers
People from the Metropolitan Borough of Doncaster
Officers of the Order of the British Empire
20th-century British Army personnel
Royal Corps of Signals soldiers
Fellows of the American Physical Society